The Autoblindo Lince ("Lynx") was an Italian scout car used by the Italian Social Republic between 1943-1945 during World War II. The Lince was a copy of the British Daimler Dingo and was primarily used for reconnaissance. Its armament consisted of a single 8 mm machine gun. Some 250 vehicles were built in all.

In 1943 only a single vehicle was completed but the German forces tested this prototype and ordered 300, of which 129 examples were delivered in 1944-45 and designated Panzerspähwagen Lince 202(i).

These cars were employed in Italy and the Balkans for reconnaissance, escort and internal security, some being assigned to support Organisation Todt.

References

External links
 Lince (Lynx) Armored Cars at wwiivehicles.com
 Lince Panzerspähwagen Lince 202(i) beatepanzer.ru
 Surviving Italian Armoured Cars (pdf)

Armoured cars of Italy
World War II scout cars
Gio. Ansaldo & C. armored vehicles
Lince (armored car)
Military vehicles introduced from 1940 to 1944
World War II armoured fighting vehicles of Italy